Give 'Em Hell is the fifth solo release by heavy metal singer Sebastian Bach, and the third to include all original studio recordings. The album was released in Japan on March 26, 2014, in Europe on April 18, and in North America on April 22 by Frontiers Records. The album's lead single "Temptation", premiered on Jay Mohr's Stories podcast on February 17, 2014. Music videos were made for the single "Temptation", "Taking Back Tomorrow" and "All My Friends Are Dead".

Track listing

Personnel 
 Sebastian Bach – lead vocals
 Duff McKagan – bass guitar
 Devin Bronson – guitar
 Bobby Jarzombek – drums and percussion

Guest musician
 John 5 – guitar (4)
 Steve Stevens – guitar (5, 7, 8)

Production
 Bob Marlette – producer
 Tom Baker – mastering
 Richard Villa – cover art

Commercial performance
The album debuted at No. 72 on the Billboard 200 and at No. 3 in the Hard Rock Albums chart with 4,000 copies sold in its debut week in the U.S.

Charts

References 

2014 albums
Sebastian Bach albums